Agonopterix dideganella is a moth in the family Depressariidae. It was described by Hans Georg Amsel in 1972. It is found in Iran.

References

Moths described in 1972
Agonopterix
Moths of Asia